Bertrand de la Tour (c. 1262–1332), also known as Bertrand de Turre, was a French Franciscan theologian and Cardinal.

De la Tour was born in Camboulit in the old province of Quercy, France. Serving as a provincial minister in Aquitaine from 1312 onwards he became a leading opponent of the Franciscan Spirituals. He undertook diplomatic missions for Pope John XXII with Bernard Gui from 1317-1318. After this time, he was asked to aid in evaluating the heresy of Peter Olivi. De la Tour was made Archbishop of Salerno and then Cardinal of San Vitale in 1320.

After the deposition of Michael of Cesena in 1328, on John XXII's behest de la Tour acted as vicar general of the Franciscan Order.

He was nicknamed Doctor famosus.

Bibliography

Patrick Nold, Bertrand de la Tour O.Min.: Life and Works, Archivum Franciscanum Historicum, 94 (2001), 275-323
Patrick Nold, Bertrand de la Tour O.Min.: Manuscript list and sermon supplement, Archivum Franciscanum Historicum, 95 (2002), 3-51
Patrick Nold, Pope John XXII and his Franciscan Cardinal: Bertrand de la Tour and the Apostolic Poverty Controversy (Oxford, 2003)

References

External links

1332 deaths
French Franciscans
Archbishops of Salerno
14th-century French cardinals
Cardinal-bishops of Frascati
Year of birth uncertain